A chapters list of the manga by Lynn Okamoto, . It was serialized by Shueisha in the seinen manga magazine Weekly Young Jump from January 2012 to March 2016, and was collected in 18 tankōbon volumes as of 19 May 2016.

Volume list

Chapter names are from fan translation.

References

Brynhildr in the Darkness